Canto for a Gypsy is a novel by Martin Cruz Smith (under the name "Martin Smith") first published in 1972. It is the follow up to Gypsy in Amber and also has Romano Grey as the main character.

Plot

The priceless Royal Crown of Hungary was on display in St Patrick's Cathedral in New York. Everybody wants the legendary crown of Saint Stephen for their own reasons. For the Hungarian government it is a symbol of their national greatness. Exiled rebels want it to rob the Communists of their pleasure, while an ex-Nazi art plunderer wants it to settle a very old score. Guarded by many, including the NYPD and the gypsy, Roman Grey, a heist was impossible.  But it happened, and murder, mayhem and all hell broke loose... and only Grey knows the crown's true centuries old secret.

References

External links
 Martin Cruz Smith official site

1972 American novels
Novels by Martin Cruz Smith